Dyschirius kirghizicus is a species of ground beetle in the subfamily Scaritinae. It was described by Fedorenko in 1994.

References

kirghizicus
Beetles described in 1994